The Dean of Southwell is the head (primus inter pares – first among equals) and chair of the chapter of canons, the ruling body of Southwell Minster. The dean and chapter are based at the Cathedral and Parish Church of the Blessed Virgin Mary in Southwell, Nottinghamshire. Before 2000 the post was designated as a provost, which was then the equivalent of a dean at most English cathedrals. The cathedral is the mother church of the Diocese of Southwell and Nottingham and seat of the Bishop of Southwell and Nottingham. The current dean is Nicola Sullivan.

List of deans

Provosts
1931–1945 William Conybeare
1945–1969 Hugh Heywood
1970–1978 John Pratt
1978–1991 Murray Irvine
1991–19 March 2000 David Leaning (became Dean)

Deans
19 March 2000–2006 David Leaning
8 September 2007 – 30 June 2014 (ret.) John Guille
30 June 2014 – 17 September 2016: Nigel Coates (Acting)
17 September 2016–present: Nicola Sullivan

References

Deans of Southwell
Deans of Southwell
 
Deans of Southwell